Calhoun High School is a public high school located in Port Lavaca. It is part of the Calhoun County Independent School District and serves students throughout Calhoun County. The school was established following the consolidation of all country schools in 1948. The present school was built in the 1960s when the former high school, now Travis Middle School, became overcrowded.

In 2015, the school was rated "Met Standard" by the Texas Education Agency.

Athletics
The Calhoun Sandcrabs/Sandies compete in the following sports as a member of UIL Class AAAAA:

Baseball
Basketball
Cross Country
Football
Golf
Powerlifting
Soccer
Softball
Tennis
Track and Field
Volleyball

References

External links
 Calhoun High School

Schools in Calhoun County, Texas
Public high schools in Texas